Ballentine may refer to:

People with the surname
Ella Ballentine, Canadian actress
John Goff Ballentine, American politician
Lynton Y. Ballentine, American politician
Michelle Ballentine, Jamaican athlete
Nathan Ballentine, American politician
Warren Ballentine, American lawyer and talk show host

Unincorporated communities
Ballentine, Mississippi
Ballentine, South Carolina

Other places
Ballentine Place Historic District, in Norfolk, Virginia
Ballentine / Broad Creek (Tide station), a light rail station in Norfolk, Virginia
Ballentine-Shealy House, a historic home near Lexington, South Carolina

See also
Balanchine
Ballantine (disambiguation)
Ballantine's, a brand of Scotch whisky
Ballantyne
Bellenden
Ballenden
Ballandean, Queensland
Balindean, the spelling used by the Ogilvy-Wedderburn baronets
Ballotine, a culinary sausage